HMAS Moresby, named for the explorer Captain John Moresby, was a hydrographic survey ship of the Royal Australian Navy (RAN). Serving in the RAN from 1964 to 1998, Moresby was then sold into civilian service. Renamed MV Patricia Anne Hotung, the ship was chartered by the International Organisation for Migration.

Construction
Moresby was launched at the State Dockyard, Newcastle on 7 September 1963 by the wife of Rear Admiral Gatacre. She was commissioned into the RAN on 6 March 1964. Moresby was the only ship of her class to be constructed.

Operational history
Throughout her career in the RAN, Moresby sailed over 1 million miles, and carried out surveys of Torres Strait, the D'Entrecasteaux Channel in Tasmania, Exmouth Gulf, Wilsons Promontory and the Gulf of Papua.

Decommissioning and civilian service
In October 1999, Moresby was sold to Hong Kong businessman and philanthropist Eric Hotung via Caravelle Investments Limited of Hong Kong for A$584,985. She was renamed MV Patricia Anne Hotung, and underwent a A$1 million refit at Maritime Engineers in Fremantle, Western Australia, enabling the  ship to carry 500 passengers and 2,021 tons of cargo.

Patricia Anne Hotung sailed in support of the International Organisation for Migration (IOM), and transported approximately 10,000 refugees from the West Timor camps to East Timor between January 2000 and 24 July 2001. IOM Director General Brunson McKinley described the ship's role as "invaluable" and "a remarkable contribution to the international humanitarian effort to bring East Timorese refugees home to begin rebuilding their devastated country"

References

Survey ships of the Royal Australian Navy
1963 ships
Ships built in New South Wales